Social Institute, Turin, is a private Catholic primary and secondary school, located in Turin, Italy. The school was established by the Jesuits in 1881, and has over 800 pupils from kindergarten through to secondary school.

History 
In 1679, the Jesuits had opened College of Nobles in Turin. The building was designed by Guarino Guarini, who conceived a building with three equally ornate levels. Today this building houses Museo Egizio.

Currently the Jesuit Education Foundation oversees this among six Italian colleges and one in Albania.

Notable alumni 

 Giovanni Conso - jurist
 Piero Fassino - politician
 Giovanni Maria Flick - jurist
 Pier Giorgio Frassati - blessed social activist
 Ludovico Geymonat - philosopher
 Federico Lombardi - priest
 Carlo Maria Martini - cardinal
 Neja - singer
 Cesare Pavese - poet
 Mario Soldati - film director

See also

 Education in Turin
 List of schools in Italy
 List of Jesuit schools

References  

Jesuit secondary schools in Italy
Jesuit primary schools in Italy
Educational institutions established in 1881
1881 establishments in Italy
Schools in Turin